The 2022-23 Ethiopian Premier League is the 76th season of top-tier football in Ethiopia (24rd season as the Premier League). The season started on September 30, 2022. The first round of matches are being held at Bahir Dar Stadium and Dire Dawa Stadium, while the second round of matches were held at Adama, Addis Ababa Stadium and Hawassa Stadium.

Clubs

2022-23 season 
The following 16 clubs are competing in the Ethiopian Premier League during the 2022–23 season. For a list of winners of the Ethiopian Premier League since its inception, see List of Ethiopian football champions.

2021–22 season 

 Champion: Saint George SC
 Relegated: Sebeta City, Jimma Aba Jifar, Addis Ababa City
 Promoted: Ethio Electric S.C.,Legetafo Legedadi and Ethiopian Insurance F.C.

Results

Top scorers

References 

Premier League
Ethiopian Premier League
Ethiopian Premier League